Changchung Cathedral is the nominal cathedral of the Roman Catholic Diocese of Pyongyang, North Korea, located in the Changchung neighborhood of Songyo-guyok, Pyongyang. It is one of only four official Christian places of worship in Pyongyang. It operates under the Korean Catholic Association.

History
Before the division of Korea, Pyongyang was the city with the highest number of Christian believers in Korea, and was known as the "Korean Jerusalem". Therefore, Pyongyang was made into the only diocese in northern Korea.

After the division of Korea, however, the Communist government under Kim Il-sung persecuted Christians as imperialist collaborators and spies; even the famous Christian Nationalist Cho Man-sik, initially more influential than Kim, was arrested and shot. Much of the Catholic community was either killed or imprisoned, and many more fled south.

The original cathedral, built of red brick in the late 19th century, was destroyed in the Korean War by American forces. Earlier, in 1949, the last formal Bishop of Pyongyang, Francis Hong Yong-ho, had been imprisoned by the communist government; he later disappeared. His death was acknowledged by the Holy See in 2013, although the exact date of death is unknown.

In 1988 a new cathedral was opened in East Pyongyang. At the same time, two nondenominational Protestant churches were opened in an effort by the government to show religious freedom.

Operation
The cathedral is operated by the Korean Catholic Association and is not affiliated with the Holy See. Because of the strained relations with the Holy See, the cathedral currently has no bishop or even an ordained priest. There is no resident priest either. Masses are offered by foreign clergy.

There is a noodle factory associated with the church that receives financial support from the Roman Catholic Archdiocese of Seoul and Catholic Koreans in the United States.

See also
 Roman Catholicism in North Korea
 Bongsu Church
 Chilgol Church
 Church of the Life-Giving Trinity

References

Further reading

External links

 360 virtual tour of Changchung Cathedral
 Video of the Changchung Church
 Photo
 Photo
 Article featuring the church
 Article 
 Changchung Cathedral at Naenara

Roman Catholic cathedrals in North Korea
Buildings and structures in Pyongyang
Roman Catholic churches completed in 1988
1988 establishments in North Korea
20th-century Roman Catholic church buildings
20th-century architecture in North Korea